Hildebrand's skink (Paracontias hildebrandti) is a species of skinks. It is endemic to Madagascar.

References

Paracontias
Reptiles described in 1880
Reptiles of Madagascar
Taxa named by Wilhelm Peters